Fisk (also Fisk Corners) is an unincorporated community located in the Town of Utica, Winnebago County, Wisconsin, United States.

Fisk Approach Control
A temporary FAA approach control facility guiding planes visually toward the active runways at Wittman Field during EAA AirVenture Oshkosh.

Notes

Unincorporated communities in Winnebago County, Wisconsin
Unincorporated communities in Wisconsin